The 1953 Tipperary Senior Hurling Championship was the 63rd staging of the Tipperary Senior Hurling Championship since its establishment by the Tipperary County Board in 1887. The championship began on 30 August 1953 and ended on 4 October 1953.

Thurles Sarsfields were the defending champions.

On 4 October 1953, Borris-Ileigh won the championship after a 4-08 to 4-04 defeat of Boherlahan in the final at Thurles Sportsfield. It was their third championship title overall and their first title since 1950.

Results

Semi-finals

Final

References

Tipperary
Tipperary Senior Hurling Championship